Ferial Qadin (died 21 February 1902) was a consort to Ismail Pasha, and mother to their son Fuad I of Egypt.

Background
She married Ismail Pasha, and gave birth to the future King Fuad I on 26 March 1868 in the Giza Palace. Ismail was deposed in 1879, and was succeeded by his son Tewfik Pasha. She was widowed at Ismail's death in 1895.

She died on 21 February 1902 in the Saffron Palace, Cairo, twenty years before her son Fuad ascended the throne. She was buried in the Khedival Mausoleum located in Al-Rifa'i Mosque, Cairo.

Fuad adored his mother, and believed that "F" was his lucky letter. The names of his five daughters and son Farouk all started with F, and Farouk  continued the practice with his own children.

See also

Muhammad Ali Dynasty family tree

References

1902 deaths
Egyptian concubines
Egyptian princesses
Egyptian slaves
Ferial
19th-century Egyptian women